The San Diego-La Jolla Underwater Park spans  of ocean bottom and tidelands. The park's four distinct habitats (rocky reef, kelp bed, sand flats, and submarine canyon) make it a popular destination for snorkelers and scuba divers. The park was created by the City of San Diego in 1970 and actually has two other parks within it: the "look but don't touch" Ecological Reserve and the Marine Life Refuge.

Within the underwater park are two artificial reefs, created to attract and enhance marine life. The second was started in 1975 and is located at a depth of  just offshore from Black's Beach.

From La Jolla Shores, the ocean bottom slopes gently out to sea. The reefs keep the waves minimal, making this an entry point for divers and kayakers. Kelp beds on the outer edges of the slope are popular fishing spots and great for observing seals, dolphins, birds and fish.

Beyond the slope the bottom takes a sudden and -deep plunge into the La Jolla Canyon. The canyon reaches depths of  within the park. The abrupt drop and abundance of marine life help to explain why migrating whales can often be spotted close to shore.

A  by  lithocrete map of the underwater park was completed in September 2008 at La Jolla Shores beach. It is located near the boardwalk between the restrooms and the children's play area at the south end of Kellogg Park.

Ecological Reserve and Marine Life Refuge
It covers all of La Jolla Cove to a point midway on the La Jolla Shores beach. No fishing or scavenging is permitted within the reserve.

The Marine Life Refuge encompasses the Scripps Pier at Scripps Institution of Oceanography and was established back in 1929 as an academic research area. Recreation and fishing are permitted in the refuge.

The La Jolla Caves 

The seven sea caves in La Jolla are perched within a 75-million-year-old sandstone sea cliff.  The sea cliff most commonly referred to as the 7 Caves of La Jolla.  These seven sculpted cave openings face north, as they sit in between beach of La Jolla Shores and the sandy beach of La Jolla Cove. The seven sea caves are named as follows, from west to east:  The Clam’s Cave, Sunny Jim’s Cave, Arch Cave, Sea Surprize, Shopping Cart, Little Sister, and White Lady. The La Jolla Sea Caves are only accessible by kayak, except Sunny Jim's.

Sunny Jim’s cave is the only La Jolla cave that is accessible by land via a hand-dug tunnel leading down from the historical landmark, the Cave Store. The cave was given this name "Sunny Jim" by Frank Baum, the author of The Wizard of Oz. Mr. Baum gave the cave this unique name due to the shape of the cave's opening.  Looking outward from the inside of the cave opening resembles a cartoon mascot for British Force Wheat Cereal in the 1920s.  The profile of this cereal character matched that of the cave opening.

Over the years, visitors have been attracted the seven caves of La Jolla. Long ago smugglers used it to bring in illegal Chinese and other immigrants. Contraband whiskey was also smuggled through the cave during Prohibition. Today many visitors visit “The Cave Store”. The cave opening has been revived and protected over the past 100 years of preservation. The old Crescent Café, which is now called The Cave Store is located on 1325 Coast boulevard in La Jolla.

The Clam’s Cave is the only sea cave that is visible from land. The Clam’s Cave is double sided and the backside can be seen from Goldfish Point on Coast Blvd. The other La Jolla caves are only visible via the ocean. These other caves are usually awash in waves and therefore seldom seen by anyone except kayakers. White Lady, named for her long, bustled-dress silhouette, is located on the eastern corner of the sea cliff. In front of the cave White Lady, there are many larger rocks in the ocean that promote crashing waves and white wash, lending significance to the description “white.”  The La Jolla Caves can be witnessed only by kayak.

Beyond the Boundary 

While the park itself used to be a very productive fishery for lobster, abalone, halibut, mako shark and various other species of fish, the boundaries are still heavily fished for many types of species.  One of the most active community fishing the adjacent areas are the saltwater fly fisherman who practice catch and release of many fish as well as fishing the adjacent kelp beds outside the boundary.

External links

The San Diego-La Jolla Underwater Park Ecological Reserve, Vol. 1, La Jolla Cove
 The San Diego-La Jolla Underwater Park Ecological Reserve, Vol. 2, La Jolla Shores & Canyon
 City of San Diego: La Jolla Cove
 Mac.com: La Jolla Underwater Park Map
 La Jolla Underwater Park Simulator - Virtual Dive Site of the La Jolla Underwater Park based on the eDiving simulator

Parks in San Diego
La Jolla, San Diego
Beaches of Southern California
San Diego
Beaches of San Diego County, California